Chandybil District is a former borough of Ashgabat in Turkmenistan. It was merged into Archabil District on 4 February 2015. Archabil District was subsequently renamed Büzmeýin District of Ashgabat (viz.) in 2018.

See also
 Districts of Turkmenistan

Districts of Turkmenistan